The 1973 Pacific Coast Open – Singles was an event of the 1973 Pacific Coast Open tennis tournament and was played on outdoor hard courts at the Round Hill Country Club in Alamo in the San Francisco Bay Area in the United States between September 23 and September 30, 1973. Jimmy Connors was the defending Pacific Coast Championships champion but did not take part in this edition. Fourth-seeded Roy Emerson won the title by defeating sixth-seeded Björn Borg 5–7, 6–1, 6–4 in the final.

Seeds

Draw

Finals

Top half

Bottom half

References

External links
 ITF tournament edition details

Tennis in California